Jacob Pitzer Cowan (March 20, 1823 – July 9, 1895) was a U.S. Representative from Ohio.

Biography
Born in Florence, Washington County, Pennsylvania Cowan attended the common schools.
He moved with his parents to Steubenville, Ohio, in 1835.
He engaged in the manufacture of woolens until 1843.
He studied medicine.
In 1846 moved to Ashland County, Ohio, where he commenced the practice of his profession.
He was graduated from Starling Medical College, Columbus, Ohio, March 6, 1855.
He served as member of the State house of representatives 1855-1857.
He resumed the practice of medicine in 1859.

Cowan was elected as a Democrat to the Forty-fourth Congress (March 4, 1875 – March 3, 1877).
He served as chairman of the Committee on Militia (Forty-fourth Congress).
He was an unsuccessful candidate for renomination in 1876.
He again engaged in the practice of medicine in Ashland, Ohio, where he died July 9, 1895.
He was interred in Ashland Cemetery.

Sources

1823 births
1895 deaths
People from Ashland, Ohio
Democratic Party members of the Ohio House of Representatives
Physicians from Ohio
Politicians from Steubenville, Ohio
People from Washington County, Pennsylvania
Democratic Party members of the United States House of Representatives from Ohio
19th-century American politicians
Ohio State University College of Medicine alumni